Izuru may refer to the fictional characters:

 Izuru Kira, a Soul Reaper featured in the Japanese manga and anime series Bleach
 Izuru Kamukura, the mastermind behind "The Tragedy" in the Japanese media franchise Danganronpa

People 
 , Japanese scriptwriter and film director 
 , Japanese linguist and essayist
 , Japanese mixed martial artist

Japanese masculine given names